The fauna of Illinois include a wide variety of mammals, birds, amphibians, reptiles, fish and insects (not listed).

The state bird is the Northern cardinal.
The state insect is the monarch butterfly.
The state animal is the white-tailed deer.
The state fish is the bluegill.
The state fossil is the tully monster.
The state amphibian is the eastern tiger salamander.
The state reptile is the painted turtle.

List of native species

Mammals

Birds

Amphibians

Frogs and toads

Salamanders

Reptiles

Turtles

Lizards

Snakes

Fish

Sources
http://www.inhs.illinois.edu/animals_plants/birds/ilbirds.html
http://www.inhs.illinois.edu/cbd/collections/mammal/ilmammals.html
http://www.inhs.illinois.edu/animals_plants/herps/ilspecies.html
http://www.ifishillinois.org/species/species.html

 
Environment of Illinois